A palas is that part of a medieval imperial palace or castle which contains the great hall and other prestigious state rooms.

Palas may also refer to:

Places
 Palas, Iran, a village in Iran
 Palas, a former commune, nowadays a neighbourhood in Constanța, Romania
 Palas, Turkey, a town in Turkey
 Las Palas, a town in Spain
 Palas, Kohistan, a valley in Pakistan

Other
 Palas, a type of striped kilim, a flatwoven rug; also the woollen robes of dervishes
 Pala dynasty of South Asia
 Palas, a type of glutinous rice dish.
 Palas Power Station, Romania
 Palas Iași, a lifestyle center in Romania

See also
 Pala (disambiguation)
 Palace (disambiguation)
 Palais (disambiguation)
 Pallas (disambiguation)